KJVL may refer to:

 KJVL (FM), a radio station (88.1 FM) licensed to Hutchinson, Kansas, United States
 Southern Wisconsin Regional Airport (ICAO code KJVL)